Slug Catcher is the name of a unit in the gas refinery or petroleum industry in which slugs at the outlet of pipelines are collected or caught.  A slug is a large quantity of a liquid that exists in a multi-phase pipeline.

Slugs 

Pipelines that transport both gas and liquids together, known as two-phase flow, can operate in a flow regime known as slugging flow or slug flow.  Under the influence of gravity, liquids will tend to settle on the bottom of the pipeline, while the gases occupy the top section of the pipeline.  Under certain operating conditions gas and liquid are not evenly distributed throughout the pipeline, but travel as large plugs with mostly liquids or mostly gases through the pipeline. These large plugs are called slugs.

Slugs exiting the pipeline can overload the gas/liquid handling capacity of the plant at the pipeline outlet, as they are often produced at a much larger rate than the equipment is designed for.

Slugs can be generated by different mechanisms in a pipeline:

 Terrain slugging is caused by the elevations in the pipeline, which follows the ground elevation or the sea bed. Liquid can accumulate at a low point of the pipeline until sufficient pressure builds up behind it. Once the liquid is pushed out of the low point, it can form a slug.
 Hydrodynamic slugging is caused by gas flowing at a fast rate over a slower flowing liquid phase. The gas will form waves on the liquid surface, which may grow to bridge the whole cross-section of the line. This creates a blockage on the gas flow, which travels as a slug through the line.
 Riser-based slugging, also known as severe slugging, is associated with the pipeline risers often found in offshore oil production facilities. Liquids accumulate at the bottom of the riser until sufficient pressure is generated behind it to push the liquids over the top of the riser, overcoming the static head. Behind this slug of liquid follows a slug of gas, until sufficient liquids have accumulated at the bottom to form a new liquid slug.
 Pigging slugs are caused by pigging operations in the pipeline. The pig is designed to push all or most of the liquids contents of the pipeline to the outlet. This intentionally creates a liquid slug.

Slugs formed by terrain slugging, hydrodynamic slugging or riser-based slugging are periodical in nature. Whether a slug is able to reach the outlet of the pipeline depends on the rate at which liquids are added to the slug at the front (i.e. in the direction of flow) and the rate at which liquids leave the slug at the back. Some slugs will grow as they travel the pipeline, while others are damped and disappear before reaching the outlet of the pipeline.

Purpose of the slug catcher 
A slug catcher is a vessel with sufficient buffer volume to store the largest slugs expected from the upstream system. The slug catcher is located between the outlet of the pipeline and the processing equipment. The buffered liquids can be drained to the processing equipment at a much slower rate to prevent overloading the system. As slugs are a periodical phenomenon, the slug catcher should be emptied before the next slug arrives

Slug catchers can be used continuously or on-demand. A slug catcher permanently connected to the pipeline will buffer all production, including the slugs, before it is sent to the gas and liquid handling facilities. This is used for difficult to predict slugging behaviour found in terrain slugging, hydrodynamic slugging or riser-based slugging. Alternatively, the slug catcher can be bypassed in normal operation and be brought online when a slug is expected, usually during pigging operations. An advantage of this set-up is that inspection and maintenance on the slug catcher can be done without interrupting the normal operation.

Slug catcher types 

Slug catchers are designed in different forms,
 A vessel type slug catcher is essentially a conventional vessel. This type is simple in design and maintenance.
 A finger type slug catcher consists of several long pieces of pipe ('fingers'), which together form the buffer volume. The advantage of this type of slug catcher is that pipe segments are simpler to design for high pressures, which are often encountered in pipeline systems, than a large vessel.  A disadvantage is that its footprint can become excessively large. An example of a large finger-type slug catcher can be seen in Den Helder, The Netherlands, using Google Maps. The incoming pipeline containing gas and liquid is routed to the inlet of the slug catcher. The inlet comprises a large diameter manifold and splitter section where the gas/liquid is divided into 2, 4, 6 or 8 horizontal pipes of 24, 30, 36, 42 or 48-inch diameter. Gas/liquid separation takes place in these pipes with the liquid dropping to the bottom of the pipes with the gas above. Liquid-free gas is drawn off at the far end of the separation pipes by risers at the top of the pipes. The risers are manifolded together and the gas is routed to further treatment. From the base of the separation pipes liquids flow through down-comers into a further, lower array of horizontal pipes. These pipes slope down away from the inlet, they can typically be 100 to 250 metres in length. The initial section of the lower pipes provides for further gas/liquid separation and the far end provides a buffer storage volume for the liquids which are drawn off at a steady rate for further treatment. The operating pressure in the slug catcher is maintained by a pressure controller and pressure control valve in the gas outlet. The liquid level in the storage end of the slug catcher is controlled by a liquid level controller and level control valve in the liquid outlet.
 A Parking Loop slug catcher combines features of the vessel and finger types. The Gas/Liquid Separation occurs in the Vessel, while the Liquid is stored in the parking loop shaped fingers.
 A Hybrid Slug Catcher combines the high efficiency of a vessel separator and the large storage volume of a harp slug catcher.

Slug catcher locations 
Finger type slug catchers are large in size and can be observed on satellite images. The following table is generated using Google Earth and gives an overview of slug catchers in the world. The slug catcher length is determined using measurement tool in Google Earth and is estimated to be +/- 5 meters accurate.

References 

http://www.glossary.oilfield.slb.com/en/Terms/s/slug_flow.aspx

Petroleum production
Natural gas technology
Pipeline transport
Pigging